Defensor (Latin, 'one who defends') may refer to:

Arts, entertainment and media
 Defensor (comics), a character in Marvel Super Hero Contest of Champions
 Defensor (Transformers), a character in the media franchise

People
Defensor, a monk, compiler of the early medieval anthology Liber Scintillarum
Arthur Defensor Sr. (born 1941), a Filipino politician
Arthur Defensor Jr. (born 1969), a Filipino politician
Matias Defensor Jr. (born 1943), a Filipino politician
Mike Defensor (born 1969), a Filipino politician
Miriam Defensor Santiago (1945–2016), a Filipino academic, lawyer and statesman

Sports
 Defensor Arica, a Peruvian football club 
 Defensor Casablanca, a Chilean Football club
 Defensores de Belgrano, an Argentine sports club
 Defensores de Belgrano de Villa Ramallo, an Argentine sports club 
 Defensores de Cambaceres, an Argentine football club
 Defensor La Bocana, a Peruvian football club
 Defensor Lima, a Peruvian football club
 Defensor San Alejandro, a Peruvian football club
 Defensor San José, a Peruvian football club
 Defensor Sporting, a sports club in Uruguay
 Defensores Unidos, an Argentine football club
 Defensor Villa del Mar, a Peruvian football club
 Defensor Zarumilla, a Peruvian football club

Other uses
El Defensor de Granada ('The Defender of Granada'), 19th/early 20th century Spanish newspaper
El Defensor del Obrero ('The Defender of the Worker'), Uruguayan newspaper 1895–1896

See also 

 Defender (disambiguation)
 Protector (disambiguation)
 Defensor matrimonii ('defender of the bond') a Catholic Church official 
 Defensor pacis ('defender of peace'), a 1324 tract by Marsilius of Padua about popular sovereignty
 Defensor minor, written around 1342
 Defensor Fortis, motto of United States Air Force Security Forces
 Fidei defensor ('defender of the faith'), a phrase used as part of the full style of many monarchs and heads of state